Erhard Domay (30 April 1940, Gießen - 25 June 2012) was a German Protestant theologian, mainly notable as the author and editor of several works on liturgy.

Life
He studied Protestant theology and German studies at the Johannes Gutenberg-Universität Mainz and the Philipps-Universität Marburg from 1960 to 1964.

Selected works 
 Erhard Domay: Und es lohnt sich doch. Tagebuch eines Pfarrers, Gütersloh 1977.
 Erhard Domay, Johannes Jourdan und Horst Nitschke (Hg.): Rufe. Religiöse Lyrik der Gegenwart, Band 1 Gütersloh 1979, Band 2 Gütersloh 1981.
 Erhard Domay (ed.): Mit Vertrauen leben. Lesebuch für Gespräche über den Glauben, Band 1 Auf dem Weg zu mir selbst, Stuttgart 1983; Band 2 Auf der Suche nach Gott, Stuttgart 1984.
 Erhard Domay: Dein heiliger Engel sei mit mir. Gedanken und Bilder von den Wegen Gottes in unserer Welt, Lahr 1991.
 Erhard Domay (ed.): Menschenzeit Gotteszeit. Ein Vorlesebuch zum Kirchenjahr für Schule und Gemeinde, Lahr 1992.
 Erhard Domay: Vorlesebuch Symbole. Geschichten zu biblischen Bildwörtern. Für Kinder von 6-12 Jahren, Lahr 1994 3. Auflage.
 Erhard Domay (ed.): Leben in Gemeinschaft mit der Schöpfung. Ein Vorlesebuch für Schule und Gemeinde, Lahr 1994.
 Erhard Domay: Mein Engel hat immer Zeit für mich. Mit sechs farbigen Abbildungen. Verlag Ernst Kaufmann,  Lahr 1993. (Katholischer Kinder- und Jugendbuchpreis der Deutschen Bischofskonferenz 1995 Empfehlung)
 Erhard Domay in Zusammenarbeit mit Ursel Heinz: Wende dich zu mir. Gebete mit Sterbenden, Gütersloh 1995.
 Erhard Domay and Hanne Köhler (ed.s): der gottesdienst, Liturgische Texte in gerechter Sprache. Teil 1: Der Gottesdienst, Gütersloh 1997.
 Erhard Domay and Hanne Köhler (ed.s): der gottesdienst, Liturgische Texte in gerechter Sprache. Teil 2: Das Abendmahl/Die Kasualien, Gütersloh 1998.
 Erhard Domay and Hanne Köhler (ed.s): der gottesdienst, Liturgische Texte in gerechter Sprache. Teil 3: Die Psalmen, Gütersloh 1998.
 Erhard Domay and Hanne Köhler (ed.s): der gottesdienst, Liturgische Texte in gerechter Sprache. Teil 4: Die Lesungen, Gütersloh 2001.
 Erhard Domay and Vera-Sabine Winkler, Im Brennglas der Worte. Zeitgenössische Lyrik als Element der Liturgie, Gütersloh 2002.
 Erhard Domay, Spiritualität leben, Gütersloh 2002
 Erhard Domay and Hanne Köhler (ed.s): Werkbuch Gerechte Sprache in Gemeinde und Gottesdienst, Gütersloh 2003.
 Erhard Domay and Hanne Köhler (ed.s): Gottesdienstbuch in gerechter Sprache. Gebete, Lesungen, Fürbitten und Segenssprüche für die Sonn- und Feiertage des Kirchenjahres, Gütersloh 2003.
 Erhard Domay and Hanne Köhler (ed.s): Die Feste im Kirchenjahr. Gottesdienste und Erläuterungen zum Feiern in gerechter Sprache, Gütersloh 2004.
 Erhard Domay, Burkhard Jungcurt and Hanne Köhler (ed.s): Singen von deiner Gerechtigkeit. Das Gesangbuch in gerechter Sprache, Gütersloh 2005.
 Erhard Domay: Neue Gottesdienstgebete. Gebete für alle Sonn- und Feiertage des Kirchenjahres, Gütersloh 2005.
 Margarete Luise Goecke-Seischab and Erhard Domay: Botschaft der Bilder. Christliche Kunst sehen und verstehen lernen, Lahr, 2005, 2. veränderte Auflage (1. Auflage 1990).
 Ulrike Bail, Frank Crüsemann, Marlene Crüsemann, Erhard Domay, Jürgen Ebach, Claudia Janssen, Hanne Köhler, Helga Kuhlmann, Martin Leutzsch and Luise Schottroff (ed.s), Gütersloh 2006, 3. Auflage 2007.

External links
 
 
 Weidenkirche Kaiserslautern Ansichten und Einsichten (pdf-Dokument u. a. mit Texten von Erhard Domay).
 STÜCKWERKE – WERKSTÜCKE Moderne Kunstwerke, entstanden im Dialog mit alten Sachen aus Kirchen (Ausstellung im Jahr 2000 in Speyer).

1940 births
2012 deaths
German Protestant theologians